The A882 road is entirely within Caithness in the Highland area of Scotland.

About  from Wick the road passes through the village of Watten, where it is crossed by the B870. 

The A882 is part of the most direct route between Wick and the burgh of Thurso:  of the A9 complete the route.

Between Wick and Watten the traveller has Wick River to the right. The road crosses the river at Watten. Between Watten and Georgemas Loch Watten and Loch Scarmclate are to the right. The traveller who continues to Thurso on the A9 will have the River Thurso to the left.

Towns, villages and junctions
The A882 runs through or near towns and villages listed below. Junctions listed are with other classified roads.

Roads in Scotland
Transport in Highland (council area)